Hudson is a jazz album by drummer Jack DeJohnette, bassist Larry Grenadier, keyboardist John Medeski and guitarist John Scofield. The album was released on June 9, 2017 by Motéma.

Background 
Hudson is the name of the quartet; it is inspired by the beauty and history of the Hudson River from which Woodstock is a few miles away. Bassist Larry Grenadier is himself a resident of the Hudson Valley. What is more, DeJohnette appeared on 1996 Michael Brecker's album Tales from the Hudson, which had similar instrumentation—except for Brecker's saxophone.

The quartet initially played a concert together at the 2014 Woodstock Jazz Festival; that experience encouraged the band to pursue the project, culminating in the present record. Hudson is the band's debut, eponymous album consisting of not only originals by bandmembers but also new renditions of famous songs by such musicians as Bob Dylan, Joni Mitchell, The Band, and Jimi Hendrix. Another relevant touchstone, unstated but clearly implied, is Miles Davis. The album also includes a new version of "Dirty Ground" (from DeJohnette's 2011 album Sound Travels) recorded there with lyrics and vocals by Bruce Hornsby. The album clearly celebrates the music from the late 1960s and early 1970s. Hudson was recorded directly to Pro Tools at 24-bit/96 kHz at Scott Petito's NRS Recording Studio, in Catskill, New York. Petito has been DeJohnette's recording engineer for some 20 years. The label's official website also states that the release celebrates Jack DeJonnette's 75th birthday.

Reception

Paul de Barros of DownBeat wrote, "It would be easy to dismiss the supergroup Hudson as mere boomer nostalgia, but that would overlook just how vigorous, original, engaged and downright pleasurable this welcome debut sounds.... The band jumps deep into free territory on the title-track opener, an archeo-futuristic jam that spins raunchy, fuzzed guitar and skronky keyboard clanks around a throbbing, ceremonial beat". Seth Colter Walls of Pitchfork Media stated, "This is not the most fiery music DeJohnette has collaborated on, in his eighth decade. But the peaceable mastery that moves through Hudson does have the distinction of feeling comfortable without being too predictable". John Fordham in his review for The Guardian added, "The group's slightly clunky Native American chanting might have been better replaced by sampled field-recordings with instrumental decoration, but this is an elite jazz outfit collectively telling a compelling new story". Nate Chinen of JazzTimes commented "What they're creating is a top-to-bottom group improvisation—a jam, if we're being plainspoken about it—with the morphing shape of an amoeba. But over the course of a discursive and open-ended 23 minutes, a kind of structural integrity emerges, rooted in the loopy clarity of DeJohnette's groove". Writing for Elmore, Jim Hynes stated, "The album is a showcase for all four of them... Given the mostly electric fare, particularly on the rock numbers, it’s tempting to call this jazz fusion but it feels different. It’s lighter."

Track listing

Personnel
John Medeski – piano, electric piano, organ, flute, vocals
John Scofield – guitar, flute
Larry Grenadier – double bass, vocals
Jack DeJohnette – drums, flute, vocals

References 

2017 albums
Jack DeJohnette albums
John Medeski albums
John Scofield albums
Larry Grenadier albums
Motéma Music albums